Southern Italian may refer to:

 Anything of or from Southern Italy or the Mezzogiorno
 The Neapolitan language, a language group native to Southern Italy
 The Calabrian language, a language group native to Southern Italy
 The Sicilian language, a language group native to Southern Italy

See also

South Italy, a statistical region
Southern Italy (European Parliament constituency)

Language and nationality disambiguation pages